Al Ain FC is an Emirati football club in Al Ain, United Arab Emirates that competes in the UAE Pro League, it has contested in various international competitions and has won two titles so far. It has made the most appearances in the AFC Champions League out any other team in the United Arab Emirates and is by far the only team in the UAE to win a Champions League title after winning the 2003 Asian CL Final.

History
Al Ain first contested participation was in 1995 Asian Cup Winners' Cup were they lost to Kazma SC 0–6 on aggregate. Al Ain won their first international title in the 2001 Gulf Club Champions Cup after finishing first in a round-robin tournament, however only two years later Al Ain would win its first major international title after beating BEC Tero Sasana 2–1 on aggregate, Al Ain became the first Emirati team to win the Asian Cup and is by far the only UAE side to do so in present time. Al Ain would qualify for the final of the ACL twice only to lose both finals. Al Ain also qualified for the 2018 FIFA Club World Cup Final were they lost to Real Madrid CF 1–4.

Overall record
 Legend: GF = Goals For. GA = Goals Against. GD = Goal Difference.

Participations
 QS : Qualifying Stage, R1 : First round, R2 : Second round, GS : Group Stage, R16 : Round of 16,  QF : Quarterfinals, SF : Semifinal, R : Runner-up, C : Champions

International competitions

AFC Champions League

Asian Club Championship

Asian Cup Winners' Cup

Arab Club Champions Cup

GCC Champions League

FIFA Club World Cup

Statistics

By competition

By country

By club

References

External links

Asia
Emirati football clubs in international competitions